Drive-Thru Booty is the debut album by British band Freak Power, fronted by musician, record producer and songwriter Norman Cook (later known as Fatboy Slim), singer, songwriter and trombone player Ashley Slater and vocalist Jesse Graham. It was released in April 1994.

Singles
The album includes the singles "Turn On, Tune In, Cop Out", which originally reached number 29 in the UK Singles Chart in 1993, and "Rush", which reached number 62 in 1994. "Turn On, Tune In, Cop Out" was re-released in early 1995 and became a much bigger hit when it reached number 3 in the UK Singles Chart.

Track listing

Personnel
Jim Carmichael – drums
Norman Cook – guitar, bass, producer, vocals
Jesse Graham – vocals
Pete Eckford – percussion
Freak Power – primary artist
Cyril McCammon – keyboards, vocals
Ashley Slater – producer, trombone, vocals
Dale Davis – bass, guitars
Simon Thornton – engineer

Charts

References

External links
 AllMusic

1994 debut albums
Island Records albums
4th & B'way Records albums